Eoreuma callista is a moth in the family Crambidae. It was described by Alexander Barrett Klots in 1970. It is found in North America, where it has been recorded from Arizona and New Mexico.

The wingspan is about 22 mm. Adults are on wing from July to August.

References

Haimbachiini
Moths described in 1970